Fuzz is the third and final studio album by Canadian rock band Junkhouse. The album was recorded in the fall of 1996 at a converted church studio in Hamilton called Catherine North, which was co-owned by guitarist Dan Achen. This is Junkhouse's only album to feature Colin Cripps. The album features the hit singles "Pearly White" and "Shine".

Track listing

References

1997 albums